Samuel Alfred Barrett (1879 in Conway, Alaska – 1965) was an anthropologist and linguist who studied Native American peoples.

Education
Barrett received all three of his degrees from UC Berkeley—B.S. in 1905, M.S. in 1906, and a doctorate in Anthropology, Phonetics, and Ethno-geography 1908.

Career 

Barrett's system of naming the languages of the Pomoan group included seven names based on geographical terms: Northern Pomo, Northeastern Pomo, Southern Pomo, Eastern Pomo, Central Pomo, Southeastern Pomo, and Southwest Pomo (now more commonly referred to as Kashaya). This nomenclature has been criticized for suggesting that the various Pomoan languages are dialects of a single language, when they are in fact mutually unintelligible and therefore distinct languages.

Barrett became the director of the Milwaukee Public Museum in Milwaukee.

The final major work of his life was to produce a series of films about the peoples of Northern California such as the Pomo, particularly the Kashaya.

Works

References

External links

 
 

1879 births
1965 deaths
American anthropologists
Linguists from the United States
UC Berkeley College of Letters and Science alumni
Linguists of Pomoan languages